Gudikatti is a village in Belgaum district in the southern state of Karnataka, India.

There is an old Kannada script written on a stone, which is placed in the village temple.

References

Villages in Belagavi district